The Oberlerchner Mg 23 is a single-seat, all-wood, high-performance sailplane. It was built and first flown in Austria in 1955, and a total of 26 were built before production ended in 1965.

Design and development
The Mg 23, an Erwin Musger design often known as the Musger Mg 23, was an all-wood shoulder-wing aircraft. Its wing had a straight leading edge, a constant-chord inner section with taper outboard and 2.5° of dihedral. The wingtips had small tip fences. It was built around a single wooden spar and was wood covered apart from the ailerons, which were fabric covered. Wooden Schempp-Hirth spoilers were fitted. The tail surfaces were fabric covered, the tailplane narrow in chord and straight tapered with a Flettner trim tab on the starboard elevator. One change between the prototype Mg 23 and the production Mg 23 SL was that the size of the fin and rudder was increased; on the SL the fin was straight-edged apart from a curved fuselage fillet but the trailing edge of the wide, deep rudder was rounded.

The fuselage had an oval section of wooden semi-monocoque construction, tapering to the rear. On the production SL the fuselage line over the wings merged into a forward-sliding canopy, which was longer than that of the prototype. The Mg 23 SL had a fixed monowheel undercarriage, and both integral nose- and tailskids.

The Mg 23 prototype flew on 25 June 1955, flight testing leading to the increase in vertical tail size and a modified canopy on the production aircraft, the first of which was flown on 1 April 1962.

Operational history

26 Mg 23 SLs had been built by March 1966. In mid-2010, 11 Mg 23s were on the civil registers of European countries, nine in Austria, one in Switzerland and one in the Netherlands. Three were exported to the United States and one to Canada.

Aircraft on display

An Mg 23, one of those still on the Austrian register, is on display in the Flugmuseum Aviaticum, Wiener Neustadt-Ost, Austria
 Western Antique Aeroplane & Automobile Museum Has a 1964 mg-23SL .

Variants
Mg 23
Prototype, eight built.
Mg 23 SL
Production model, 18 built.

Specifications (Mg 23)

References

External links

1950s Austrian sailplanes
Aircraft first flown in 1955
Shoulder-wing aircraft